Daniel R. "Cyclone" Ryan (1866 – January 30, 1917) was an Irish born Major League Baseball pitcher and first baseman. Ryan played for New York Metropolitans and the Boston Beaneaters. He played in 9 games as a first baseman, and in 3 games as a pitcher.

Ryan was born in Capperwhite, Ireland and died in Medfield, Massachusetts.

External links

New York Metropolitans players
Boston Beaneaters players
1866 births
1917 deaths
Major League Baseball players from Ireland
Irish baseball players
Irish emigrants to the United States (before 1923)
Haverhill (minor league baseball) players
Boston Blues players
Jackson Jaxons players
Burlington Babies players
Logansport (minor league baseball) players
Champaign-Urbana Clippers players
Providence Clamdiggers (baseball) players
Brockton Shoemakers players
Johnstown Buckskins players
Palmyra Mormans players
Youngstown Puddlers players
Johnstown Mormans players
Auburn Maroons players
Troy Trojans (minor league) players
19th-century baseball players